Frank George Roberts (27 February 1912 – 26 June 1989) was an Australian rules footballer who played for St Kilda and Melbourne in the Victorian Football League (VFL).

While at St Kilda Roberts played as a forward, kicking 24 goals in his debut season and another 20 the following year. He spent 1935 playing back home at Sandhurst and in 1936 returned to the league with Melbourne. This time he was used as a defender and was on the half back flank in Melbourne's 1939 premiership team. He played at fullback on Richmond star Jack Titus in the 1940 Grand Final and again finished on the winning side.

References
Holmesby, Russell and Main, Jim (2007). The Encyclopedia of AFL Footballers. 7th ed. Melbourne: Bas Publishing.

External links

1912 births
Australian rules footballers from Victoria (Australia)
St Kilda Football Club players
Melbourne Football Club players
Sandhurst Football Club players
1989 deaths
Melbourne Football Club Premiership players
Two-time VFL/AFL Premiership players